Banque Nationale de Développement Agricole (BNDA) is a development bank founded in 1981 and located in Bamako, Mali. Beside providing common banking services, it focuses on financing services for:

agricultural inputs
agricultural production equipment and infrastructure
village infrastructure and water
marketing of cereals and vegetable products
agro-industry.

The bank was focused on the cotton production, financed with the help of the Compagnie Malienne pour le developpement des textiles (CMDT), but since the end of a special status for development banks, it works as an ordinary commercial bank.

References

External links 
Homepage

Banks of Mali
Banks established in 1981
1981 establishments in Mali
Companies based in Bamako